Larry P. Zikmund (born January 25, 1946) is an American politician. He serves as a Republican member for District 14 in the South Dakota House of Representatives since 2015. Zikmund serves on the Commerce and Energy and Transportation Committees and chairs the Military and Veterans affairs and Retirement Laws Committees.

References

1946 births
Living people
Businesspeople from South Dakota
Politicians from Sioux Falls, South Dakota
Republican Party members of the South Dakota House of Representatives
21st-century American politicians